Open Source Cluster Application Resources (OSCAR) is a Linux-based software installation for high-performance cluster computing. OSCAR allows users to install a Beowulf type high performance computing cluster.

See also
 TORQUE Resource Manager
 Maui Cluster Scheduler
 Beowulf cluster

External links
Official OSCAR site

github repository

Cluster computing
Parallel computing